Artur Romanovych Dumanyuk (born 15 November 1996) is a Ukrainian professional footballer who plays as a defensive midfielder for Polish club KSZO Ostrowiec Świętokrzyski on loan from Ahrobiznes Volochysk.

References

External links
 Profile on Ahrobiznes Volochysk official website
 
 

1996 births
Living people
Sportspeople from Ternopil Oblast
Ukrainian footballers
Association football midfielders
FC Ahrobiznes Volochysk players
KSZO Ostrowiec Świętokrzyski players
Ukrainian First League players
Ukrainian Second League players
Ukrainian Amateur Football Championship players
IV liga players
III liga players
Ukrainian expatriate footballers
Expatriate footballers in Poland
Ukrainian expatriate sportspeople in Poland